North Prosser is an unincorporated community in Benton County, Washington, United States, located approximately one mile north of Prosser.

The community formed around a Northern Pacific Railway Company station which was built in 1917. It was named for its location just north of Prosser.

References

Unincorporated communities in Benton County, Washington
Northern Pacific Railway
Prosser, Washington
Unincorporated communities in Washington (state)
Populated places on the Yakima River